Bonnetia lanceifolia is a species of flowering plant in the Bonnetiaceae family. It is found only in Venezuela.

References

lanceifolia
Endemic flora of Venezuela
Vulnerable plants
Taxonomy articles created by Polbot